Tanggemu (Mandarin: 塘格木镇) is a town in Xinghai County, Hainan Tibetan Autonomous Prefecture, Qinghai, China. Tanggemu has 17 villages under its township-level jurisdiction:

 Dala Village
 Dongge Village
 Gadang Village
 Gengga Village
 Haergan Village
 Huanghe Village
 Huatang Village
 Jiashenda Village
 Jintang Village
 Langniang Village
 Qurang Village
 Quzong Village
 Tanggemuzhen Village
 Wuhelei Village
 Zhide Village
 Zhihai Village
 Zhongguo Village

References 

Township-level divisions of Qinghai
Hainan Tibetan Autonomous Prefecture